Coleophora olympica is a moth of the family Coleophoridae. It is found Greece.

The larvae possibly feed on the leaves of Cytisanthus radiatus.

References

olympica
Moths described in 1983
Moths of Europe